Convoy OG 69 was a trade convoy of merchant ships during the second World War. It was the 69th of the numbered OG convoys Outbound from the British Isles to Gibraltar. The convoy departed Liverpool on 20 July 1941 and was found on 25 July by Focke-Wulf Fw 200 Condors of Kampfgeschwader 40. Nine ships were sunk by submarine attacks continuing through 30 July.

Submarines
The convoy was initially located by German Naval signals intelligence (B-Dienst), then visual confirmation was provided by a Focke-Wulf Fw 200 aircraft.  A total of 10 boats were directed to intercept the convoy – eight U-boats from Nazi Germany's Kriegsmarine and two submarines from Fascist Italy's Regia Marina.

Ships in the convoy

Allied merchant ships
A total of 28 merchant vessels joined the convoy in Liverpool, with some being sunk after detaching from the convoy to head to other destinations.

Convoy escorts
A series of armed military ships escorted the convoy at various times during its journey.

See also
 List of shipwrecks in July 1941

References

Bibliography

External links
OG.69 at convoyweb
Convoy OG 69 at uboat.net

OG069
C